Shahu (also known as Chhatrapati Rajarshi Shahu, Shahu IV,  Rajarshi Shahu Maharaj, Kolhapur's Shahu)  (26 June 1874 – 6 May 1922) of the Bhonsle dynasty of Marathas was a Raja (reign. 1894 – 1900) and the first Maharaja (1900–1922) of the Indian princely state of Kolhapur.  Rajarshi Shahu was considered a true democrat and social reformer. Shahu Maharaj was an able ruler who was associated with many progressive policies during his rule. From his coronation in 1894 till his demise in 1922, he worked for the cause of the lower caste subjects in his state. Primary education to all regardless of caste and creed was one of his most significant priorities.

Early life

He was born as Yeshwantrao in the Ghatge Maratha family, of Kagal village of the Kolhapur district as Yeshwantrao Ghatge to Jaisingrao and Radhabai on 26 June 1874. Jaisingrao Ghatge was the village chief, while his mother Radhabai hailed from the royal family of Mudhol. Young Yeshwantrao lost his mother when he was only three. His education was supervised by his father till he was 10 years old. In that year, he was adopted by Queen Anandibai, widow of King Shivaji VI, of the princely state of Kolhapur. Although the adoption rules of the time dictated that the child must have Bhosale dynasty blood in his veins, Yeshwantrao’s family background presented a unique case. He completed his formal education at the Rajkumar College, Rajkot and took lessons of administrative affairs from Sir Stuart Fraser, a representative of the Indian Civil Services. He ascended the throne in 1894 after coming of age, prior to which a regency council appointed by the British Government took care of the state affairs. During his accession Yeshwantrao was renamed as  Shahuji Maharaj. Shahu was over five feet nine inches in height and displayed a regal and majestic appearance. Wrestling was one of his favourite sports and he patronised the sport throughout his rule. Wrestlers from all over the country would come to his state to participate in wrestling competitions.

He was married to Lakshmibai Khanvilkar, daughter of a nobleman from Baroda in 1891. The couple had four children – two sons and two daughters.

Vedokta controversy
When Brahmin priests of the royal family refused to perform the rites of non-Brahmins in accordance with the Vedic hymns, this led to Shahu supporting Arya Samaj and Satyashodhak Samaj as well as campaigning for the rights of the Maratha community. He took the daring step of removing the priests and appointing a young Maratha as the religious teacher of the non-Brahmins, with the title of Kshatra Jagadguru (the world teacher of the Kshatriyas). This was known as the Vedokta controversy. It brought a hornet's nest about his ears, but he was not the man to retrace his steps in the face of opposition. He soon became the leader of the non-Brahmin movement and united the Marathas under his banner.

Social reform

Chhatrapati Shahu occupied the throne of Kolhapur for 28 years, from 1894 to 1922; during this period he initiated numerous social reforms in his empire. He is credited with doing much to improve conditions for the lower castes. He also ensured suitable employment for students thus educated, thereby creating one of the earliest affirmative action (50% reservation to weaker sections) programs in history. Many of these measures came in to  effect in the year 1902. He started Shahu Chhatrapati Weaving and Spinning Mill in 1906 to provide employment. Rajaram college was built by Shahu Maharaj, and later was named after him. His emphasis was on education, his aim being to make learning available to the masses. He introduced a number of educational programs to promote education among his subjects. He established hostels for different ethnicities and religions, including Panchals, Devadnya, Nabhik, Shimpi, Dhor-Chambhar communities as well as for Muslims, Jains and Christians. He established the Miss Clarke Boarding School for the socially quarantined segments of the community. Shahu introduced several scholarships for poor meritorious students from backward castes. He also initiated compulsory free primary education for all in his state. He established Vedic Schools which enabled students from all castes and classes to learn the scriptures, thus propagating Sanskrit education among all. He also founded special schools for village heads or ‘patils’ to make them better administrators.

Shahu was a strong advocate of equality among all strata of society and refused to give the Brahmins any special status. He removed Brahmins from the post of Royal Religious advisers when they refused to perform religious rites for non-Brahmins. He appointed a young Maratha scholar in the post and bestowed him the title of `Kshatra Jagadguru' (the world teacher of the Kshatriyas). This incident together with Shahu’s encouragement of the non-Brahmins to read and recite the Vedas led to the Vedokta controversy in Maharashtra. This dispute brought a storm of protest from the elite strata of society and vicious opposition to his rule. He established the Deccan Rayat Association in Nipani during 1916. The association sought to secure political rights for non-Brahmins and invite their equal participation in politics. Shahu was influenced by the works of Jyotiba Phule, and long patronized the Satya Shodhak Samaj, formed by Phule.

In 1903, he attended the Coronation of King Edward VII and Queen Alexandra, and in May that year received the honorary degree LL.D. from the University of Cambridge.

Shahu made great efforts to abolish the concept of caste segregation and untouchability. He introduced (perhaps the first known) reservation system in government jobs for untouchable castes. His Royal Decree ordered his subjects to treat every member of society as equal, and granting the untouchables equal access to public utilities like wells and ponds, as well as establishments like schools and hospitals. He legalised inter-caste marriage and made great efforts to improve the situation of the dalits. He discontinued the hereditary transfer of titles and tenures of revenue collectors.

He also worked towards betterment of the condition of women in his empire. He established schools to educate women, and also spoke vociferously on the topic of women's education. He legalised widow remarriage in 1917 and made efforts towards stopping child marriage. In 1920, Shahu introduced a law banning the Devadasi pratha (the practice of offering girls to God) , which essentially led to sexual exploitation of girls at the hands of the clergy.

Shahu introduced a number of projects which enabled his subjects to sustain themselves in their chosen professions. The Shahu Chhatrapati Spinning and Weaving Mill, dedicated marketplaces and co-operative societies for farmers were established to free his subjects from predacious middlemen in trading. He made credits available to farmers looking to buy equipment to modernise agricultural practices, and even established the King Edward Agricultural Institute to instruct farmers in increasing crop yield and related techniques. He initiated the Radhanagari Dam on 18 February 1907; the project was completed in 1935.and made Kolhapur self-sufficient in water.

He was a great patron of art and culture, encouraging music and the fine arts. He supported writers and researchers in their endeavours. He installed gymnasiums and wrestling pitches and highlighted the importance of health consciousness among the youth.

His seminal contribution in social, political, educational, agricultural and cultural spheres earned him the title of Rajarshi, which was bestowed upon him by the Kurmi warrior community of Kanpur.

Association with Ambedkar 
Shahumaharaj was introduced to Dr. Ambedkar by artists Dattoba Pawar and Dittoba Dalvi. The Maharaja was greatly impressed by the great intellect of young Bhimrao and his revolutionary ideas regarding untouchability. The two met a number of times during 1917–1921 and went over possible ways to abolish the negatives of caste segregation by providing "caste-based reservation" to selected people. They organised a conference for the betterment of the untouchables during 21–22 March 1920 and the Shahu made Ambedkar the Chairman as he believed that Ambedkar was the leader who would work for the amelioration of the segregated segments of the society. He even donated Rs. 2,500 to Ambedkar, when the latter started his newspaper ‘Mooknayak’ on 31 January 1921, and contributed more later for the same cause. Their association lasted till the Shahu's death in 1922.

Personal life

In 1891, Shahu married Lakshmibai née Khanvilkar (1880–1945), daughter of a Maratha nobleman from Baroda. They were the parents of four children:

 Rajaram III, who succeeded his father as Maharaja of Kolhapur.
 Radhabai 'Akkasaheb' Pawar, Maharani of Dewas (senior)(1894–1973) who married Raja Tukojirao III of Dewas(Senior) and had issue:
Vikramsinhrao Pawar, who became Maharaja of Dewas (Senior) in 1937 and who later succeeded to the throne of Kolhapur as Shahaji II.
 Sriman Maharajkumar Shivaji (1899–1918)
 Shrimati Rajkumari Aubai (1895); died young

Death 
Shahu died on 6 May 1922 in Bombay. He was succeeded by his eldest son, Rajaram III as the Maharaja of Kolhapur. The reforms initiated by Shahu gradually began to fade for the lack of able leadership to carry on the legacy.

Full name and titles
His full official name was: Colonel His Highness Kshatriya-Kulaawatans Sinhasanaadheeshwar, Shreemant Rajarshi Sir Shahu Chhatrapati Maharaj Sahib Bahadur, GCSI, GCIE, GCVO.

During his life he acquired the following titles and honorific names:

 1874–1884: Meherban Shrimant Yeshwantrao Sarjerao Ghatge
 1884–1895: His Highness Kshatriya-Kulaawatans Sinhasanaadheeshwar, Shreemant Rajarshi Shahu Chhatrapati Maharaj Sahib Bahadur, Raja of Kolhapur
 1895–1900: His Highness Kshatriya-Kulaawatans Sinhasanaadheeshwar, Shreemant Rajarshi Sir Shahu Chhatrapati Maharaj Sahib Bahadur, Raja of Kolhapur, GCSI
 1900–1903: His Highness Kshatriya-Kulaawatans Sinhasanaadheeshwar, Shreemant Rajarshi Sir Shahu Chhatrapati Maharaj Sahib Bahadur, Maharaja of Kolhapur, GCSI
 1903–1911: His Highness Kshatriya-Kulaawatans Sinhasanaadheeshwar, Shreemant Rajarshi Sir Shahu Chhatrapati Maharaj Sahib Bahadur, Maharaja of Kolhapur, GCSI, GCVO
 1911–1915: His Highness Kshatriya-Kulaawatans Sinhasanaadheeshwar, Shreemant Rajarshi Sir Shahu Chhatrapati Maharaj Sahib Bahadur, Maharaja of Kolhapur, GCSI, GCIE, GCVO
 1915–1922: Colonel His Highness Kshatriya-Kulaawatans Sinhasanaadheeshwar, Shreemant Rajarshi Sir Shahu Chhatrapati Maharaj Sahib Bahadur, Maharaja of Kolhapur, GCSI, GCIE, GCVO

Honours

 Knight Grand Commander of the Order of the Star of India(GCSI), 1895
 King Edward VII Coronation Medal, 1902
 Knight Grand Cross of the Royal Victorian Order(GCVO), 1903
 Hon. LLD(Cantabrigian), 1903
 Delhi Durbar Gold Medal, 1903
 King George V Coronation Medal, 1911
 Knight Grand Commander of the Order of the Indian Empire(GCIE), 1911
 Delhi Durbar Gold Medal, 1911

Memorials 
 An eight-foot tall statue of Shahu was installed at the Parliament House, in New Delhi. Then the President, Pratibha Patil unveiled the statue on 17 February 2009.
 President of India unveiled the statue of Shahu Maharaj in Pune on 28 December 2013

Legacy 
 In 1995, under the Uttar Pradesh Chief Minister Mayawati, Kanpur University was renamed to Chhatrapati Shahu Ji Maharaj University.
In 2006 Government of Maharashtra announced Shahu's birthday as Samajik Nyay Din.

Textbook lessons based on Shahu, Balbharti included in its Marathi language books for some Marathi school's classes. An incident in which Shahu Maharaj granted farm to a poor farmer couple was included in class fourth's Marathi school textbook's lesson in 2009.

In media 
Shahu IV was portrayed in Star Pravah's drama serial. It was about Bhimrao Ramji Ambedkar and run on Star Pravah in 2019.

See also
Bhosale Family
Reservation in India
Dalit

References

Further reading
 
 
 Entry regarding Maharaja Shahu Chhatrapati on the website of Indian Post
A brief Life Sketch

External links 

1874 births
1922 deaths
Knights Grand Commander of the Order of the Star of India
Knights Grand Commander of the Order of the Indian Empire
Knights Grand Cross of the Royal Victorian Order
Arya Samajis
People from Maharashtra
Maharajas of Kolhapur
Satyashodhak Samaj
Indian knights